is an anime series based on the manga series of the same name created by Hiroaki Samura. The series is set in Japan during the mid-Tokugawa Shogunate period and follows the cursed samurai Manji, who has to kill 1000 evil men in order to regain his mortality.

The series is animated by Liden Films and directed by Hiroshi Hamasaki, with Makoto Fukami handling series composition, Shingo Ogiso designing the characters, and Eiko Ishibashi composing the music. It premiered on October 10, 2019 on Amazon Prime Video. On October 15, 2020, it was announced that Sentai Filmworks had licensed the anime for home video release in winter 2021. The anime was released on Blu-ray on January 19, 2021.

The opening theme is "Survive of Vision" is Kiyoharu.


Episode list

Notes

References

Blade of the Immortal episode lists
Animated television series by Amazon Studios